Muhammet Beşir (born 1 January 1997) is a Turkish professional footballer who plays for Etimesgut Belediyespor.

Career
Beşir was promoted to senior level at pre-season camp of Trabzonspor in 2015 summer, however failed to hold onto senior squad. He, later on same season, was selected up to senior squad by interim manager Sadi Tekelioğlu. Beşir picked number 17 for his shirt, due to recommendations of his team mates. He made his Süper Lig debut on 14th match-day home game against Eskişehirspor 7 December 2015. Subbed on Óscar Cardozo on 83rd minute, Beşir scored his debut goal on the dying minutes of the game, ended 3–1 for Trabzonspor.

Statistics

Club

References

External links
 
 

1997 births
People from Araklı
Sportspeople from Trabzon
Living people
Turkish footballers
Association football forwards
Trabzonspor footballers
Şanlıurfaspor footballers
1461 Trabzon footballers
Samsunspor footballers
Kırklarelispor footballers
Zonguldakspor footballers
Turgutluspor footballers
Niğde Anadolu FK footballers
Süper Lig players
TFF First League players
TFF Second League players